Efyra is a village and a community in the western part of Pineia municipal unit, Elis, Greece. It lies at an altitude of 121 metres, and covers an area of 12 km², of which 55% is arable and 20% is forest. It is situated southeast of the Pineios reservoir, and west of the river Pineakos Ladonas, which also flows into the Pineios reservoir. Efyra has a church dedicated to St. George. In 2001 the population was 266 for the village, and 268 for the community, which includes the village Pirio. Efyra is 2 km southeast of Kampos, 5 km west of Simopoulo and 21 km northeast of Pyrgos.

History

Ephyra was a city of Ancient Elis, located on the river Selleeis (the present Pineakos Ladonas), and on the road to Lasion. Ephyra is mentioned by Homer as the home of the mother of Tlepolemus (Iliad) and as the place from where Telemachus brought poison (Odyssey).

Historical population

See also
List of settlements in Elis

References

Populated places in Elis